Rendrick Taylor (born April 3, 1987) is a former American football fullback. He played college football at Clemson University. He was signed as an undrafted free agent by the Tampa Bay Buccaneers in 2010.

References

External links
 Jacksonville Sharks Bio

1987 births
Living people
American football fullbacks
Clemson Tigers football players
Omaha Nighthawks players
Jacksonville Sharks players
People from Bennettsville, South Carolina
Players of American football from South Carolina